The Adventures of Sam & Max: Freelance Police is an animated television series, based on the Sam & Max comic series by Steve Purcell. The series follows vigilante private investigators Sam, an anthropomorphic dog, and Max, a lagomorph or "hyperkinetic rabbity-thing", as they investigate strange and bizarre cases and confront the criminals responsible.

The show was first aired in October 1997 on Fox Kids in the U.S. and YTV in Canada, producing 13 episodes (with 24 segments) and winning the 1998 Gemini Award for "Best Animated Series" before it was cancelled in April 1998. It was one of the first animated TV shows to have all its episodes animated in digital ink and paint.

Premise
The series revolves around Sam & Max, the freelance police accepting missions from the mysterious Commissioner, whom they have never seen. The assignments usually lead them into far-off and exotic locales such as the Moon, Mount Olympus, the centre of the Earth or the mutant inhabited waters of Bohunk Lagoon. In between these assignments, the pair also manage to squeeze in fridge-spelunking, time traveling, Bigfoot-hunting and numerous other escapades. There were also holiday-themed episodes, such as visiting a prison on Christmas and delivering an artificial heart on Valentine's Day.

Characters
 Sam: A 6-foot anthropomorphic canine detective dressed in noir-styled suit and hat. Voiced by Harvey Atkin.
 Max: An easily excitable 3-foot "hyperkinetic rabbity thing". Voiced by Robert Tinkler.
 The Commissioner: Sam & Max's mysterious agent and only known link to any form of official government body. Voiced by Dan Hennessey.
 Darla "The Geek" Gugenheek: The detectives' personal 12-year-old scientist and laboratory technician, housed in the pair's very own "Sub-Basement of Solitude". She often provides the duo with new gadgets and inventions to aid them on their missions. She is the only main character who does not also appear in the comics. Voiced by Tracey Moore.
 Lorne, The Friend For Life: A clingy and over-exuberant fan of Sam & Max, and self-declared "friend for life", who only ends up annoying the duo and getting in the way of them doing their job. Voiced by Patrick McKenna.

Episodes

Telecast and media releases
The Adventures of Sam & Max: Freelance Police was first aired in October 1997 on Fox Kids in the U.S., but was cancelled in April 1998 and was replaced by The Secret Files of the Spy Dogs. In Canada, it also aired on YTV.

Selected episodes from the show had been released in three separate compilations on VHS by Sullivan Entertainment. The episodes included in the VHS compilations are as follows:

In March 2008, the complete series was released by Shout! Factory. Features include original case art by Steve Purcell, three 'educational' shorts, an interview with Purcell, a short featurette about Telltale Games, an art gallery, an "Original Series Bible", a flash-based cartoon titled 'Our Bewildering Universe' and a playable demo of Ice Station Santa. A sticker of the Sam & Max title card was also included.

GameTap released one episode from the show each week on GameTap TV in October 2006, as a promotion for Telltale Games' Sam & Max: Season One. Their schedule includes a release of every episode, appearing out of order. Up until mid-July 2008 all episodes (except "Fools Die on Friday") were available to watch online at GameTap for free until the GameTap TV section was shut down as part of a site redesign.

As of 2022, the show is now streaming on Tubi.

References

External links

 The Adventures of Sam & Max: Freelance Police synopsis at Nelvana
 Sam & Max' at Don Markstein's Toonopedia. Archived from the original on February 10, 2017. 
 Toon Zone Interview with Purcell regarding the series
 

1990s American animated television series
1990s American children's comedy television series
1990s American police comedy television series
1997 American television series debuts
1998 American television series endings
American children's animated comedy television series
American children's animated fantasy television series
American children's animated mystery television series
Fox Broadcasting Company original programming
Fox Kids
1990s Canadian animated television series
1990s Canadian children's television series
1997 Canadian television series debuts
1998 Canadian television series endings
Canadian children's animated comedy television series
Canadian children's animated fantasy television series
Canadian children's animated mystery television series
YTV (Canadian TV channel) original programming
English-language television shows
Sam & Max
Television shows based on comics
Animated television series about dogs
Animated television series about rabbits and hares
Television series by Nelvana
Television shows set in New York City